"Mil Años Luz" is the third single released by Argentine singer and actress Lali Espósito, taken from her debut studio album A Bailar (2014). It was released via digital download on November 19, 2015. The song was written by Espósito along with music producers Pablo Akselrad, Luis Burgio and Gustavo Novello, and was produced by 3musica.

Background and release
The song was released on March 21, 2014 as part of the entire album. On November 19, 2015, the song was released as a promotional single.

Live performances
Espósito gave her first live performance of "Mil Años Luz" on the Argentine TV Show "Susana Giménez" on November 19, 2014. On May 12, 2015, Espósito performed the song at the tenth edition of "Bailando por un Sueño". The artist also performed "Mil Años Luz" at the 2015 Gardel Awards. On October 22, 2015 Espósito performed the song at the 2015 Kids' Choice Asards Argentina. The show aired on October 26 and she performed "Histeria" too. "Mil Años Luz" is also part of her setlist for Espósito's worldwide tour, A Bailar Tour.

Music videos
The video was released on Espósito's VEVO channel on February 10, 2015. The video is a multi-angle live performance at Teatro Opera in Buenos Aires. On June 19, 2015, Claro Música released a second music video to promote its app. The video shows Espósito filming herself while she's singing, turning and dancing.

Awards and nominations
The song is currently nominated in the 2015 Kids' Choice Awards Argentina in the category of "Favorite Song".

References

2014 songs
Lali Espósito songs
2014 singles
Songs written by Gustavo Novello
Songs written by Pablo Akselrad
Songs written by Lali Espósito